Sir Oswald Ernald Mosley, 6th Baronet (16 November 1896 – 3 December 1980) was a British politician during the 1920s and 1930s who rose to fame when, having become disillusioned with mainstream politics, he turned to fascism. He was a member of parliament and later founded and led the British Union of Fascists (BUF).

After military service during the First World War, Mosley was one of the youngest members of parliament, representing Harrow from 1918 to 1924, first as a Conservative, then an independent, before joining the Labour Party. At the 1924 general election he stood in Birmingham Ladywood against the future prime minister, Neville Chamberlain, coming within 100 votes of defeating him.

Mosley returned to Parliament as Labour MP for Smethwick at a by-election in 1926 and served as Chancellor of the Duchy of Lancaster in the Labour Government of 1929–31. In 1928, he succeeded his father as the sixth Mosley baronet, a title that had been in his family for more than a century. He was considered a potential Labour Prime Minister but resigned because of discord with the government's unemployment policies. He chose not to defend his Smethwick constituency at the 1931 general election, instead unsuccessfully standing in Stoke-on-Trent. Mosley's New Party became the British Union of Fascists (BUF) in 1932.

Mosley was imprisoned in May 1940 and the BUF was banned. He was released in 1943 and, politically disgraced by his association with fascism, moved abroad in 1951, spending most of the remainder of his life in Paris and two residences in Ireland. He stood for Parliament during the post-war era but received very little support. During this latter period he was an advocate of Pro-Europeanism. He is also known for the influence he had on the thinking of the founders of the Soil Association, a catalyst for the organic farming movement in Great Britain.

Life and career

Early life and education 
Mosley was born on 16 November 1896 at 47 Hill Street, Mayfair, Westminster. He was the eldest of the three sons of Sir Oswald Mosley, 5th Baronet (1873–1928), and Katharine Maud Edwards-Heathcote (1874–1950), daughter of Captain Justinian H. Edwards-Heathcote of Apedale Hall, Staffordshire. He had two younger brothers: Edward Heathcote Mosley (1899–1980) and John Arthur Noel Mosley (1901–1973).

The family traces its roots to Ernald de Mosley of Bushbury, Staffordshire, in the time of King John in the 12th century. The family was prominent in Staffordshire and three baronetcies were created, two of which are now extinct. His five-time great-grandfather John Parker Mosley, a Manchester hatter, was made a baronet in 1781. His father was a third cousin to the 14th Earl of Strathmore and Kinghorne, father of the future Queen Mother.

After Mosley's parents separated, he was raised by his mother, who went to live at Betton Hall near Market Drayton, and his paternal grandfather, Sir Oswald Mosley, 4th Baronet. Within the family and among intimate friends, he was always called "Tom". He lived for many years at his grandparents' stately home, Apedale Hall, and was educated at West Downs School and Winchester College.

Mosley was a fencing champion in his school days; he won titles in both foil and sabre, and retained an enthusiasm for the sport throughout his life.

Military service 
In January 1914, Mosley entered the Royal Military College, Sandhurst, but was expelled in June for a "riotous act of retaliation" against a fellow student. During the First World War he was commissioned into the British cavalry unit the 16th The Queen's Lancers and fought in France on the Western Front. He transferred to the Royal Flying Corps as an observer, but while demonstrating in front of his mother and sister he crashed, which left him with a permanent limp, as well as a reputation for being brave and somewhat reckless. He returned to the trenches before the injury had fully healed and at the Battle of Loos (1915) passed out at his post from pain. He spent the remainder of the war at desk jobs in the Ministry of Munitions and in the Foreign Office.

Marriage to Lady Cynthia Curzon 

On 11 May 1920, he married Lady Cynthia "Cimmie" Curzon (1898–1933), second daughter of the 1st Earl Curzon of Kedleston (1859–1925), Viceroy of India 1899–1905, Foreign Secretary 1919–1924, and Lord Curzon's first wife, the U.S. mercantile heiress Mary Leiter.

Lord Curzon had to be persuaded that Mosley was a suitable husband, as he suspected Mosley was largely motivated by social advancement in Conservative Party politics and Cynthia's inheritance. The 1920 wedding took place in the Chapel Royal in St James's Palace in London. The hundreds of guests included King George V and Queen Mary, as well as foreign royalty such as the Duke and Duchess of Brabant (later King Leopold III and Queen Astrid of Belgium).

During this marriage, he began an extended affair with his wife's younger sister, Lady Alexandra Metcalfe, and a separate affair with their stepmother, Grace Curzon, Marchioness Curzon of Kedleston, the American-born second wife and widow of Lord Curzon of Kedleston. He succeeded to the Baronetcy of Ancoats upon his father's death in 1928.

India and Gandhi 
Among his many travels, Mosley travelled to British India accompanied by Lady Cynthia in 1924. His father-in-law's past as Viceroy of India allowed for the acquaintance of various personalities along the journey. They travelled by ship and stopped briefly in Cairo.

Having initially arrived in Ceylon (present day Sri Lanka), the journey then continued through mainland India. They spent these initial days in the government house of Ceylon, followed by Madras and then Calcutta, where the Governor at the time was Lord Lytton.

Mosley met Mahatma Gandhi through C.F. Andrews, a clergyman and an intimate friend of the "Indian Saint", as Mosley described him. They met in Kadda, where Gandhi was quick to invite him to a private conference in which Gandhi was chairman. They enjoyed each other's company for the short time they were together. Mosley later called Gandhi a "sympathetic personality of subtle intelligence".

Marriage to Diana Mitford 
Cynthia died of peritonitis in 1933, after which Mosley married his mistress Diana Guinness, née Mitford (1910–2003). They married in secret in Nazi Germany on 6 October 1936 in the Berlin home of Germany's Minister of Public Enlightenment and Propaganda Joseph Goebbels. Adolf Hitler was their guest of honour.

Mosley spent large amounts of his private fortune on the British Union of Fascists (BUF) and tried to establish it on a firm financial footing by various means including an attempt to negotiate, through Diana, with Hitler for permission to broadcast commercial radio to Britain from Germany. Mosley reportedly made a deal in 1937 with Francis Beaumont, heir to the Seigneurage of Sark, to set up a privately owned radio station on Sark.

Member of Parliament 

By the end of the First World War, Mosley had decided to go into politics as a Conservative Member of Parliament, as he had no university education or practical experience because of the war. He was 21 years old. He was driven by, and in Parliament spoke of, a passionate conviction to avoid any future war, and this seemingly motivated his career. Largely because of his family background and war service, local Conservative and Labour associations preferred Mosley in several constituencies – a vacancy near the family estates seemed to be the best prospect. He was unexpectedly selected for Harrow first. In the general election of 1918 he faced no serious opposition and was elected easily. 

He was the youngest member of the House of Commons to take his seat, although Joseph Sweeney, an abstentionist Sinn Féin member, was younger. He soon distinguished himself as an orator and political player, one marked by extreme self-confidence, and made a point of speaking in the House of Commons without notes. 

Mosley was an early supporter of the economist John Maynard Keynes. The economic historian Robert Skidelsky described Mosley as "a disciple of Keynes in the 1920s".

Crossing the floor 
Mosley was at this time falling out with the Conservatives over its Irish policy, and condemned the operations of the Black and Tans against civilians during the Irish War of Independence. He was secretary of the Peace with Ireland Council. As secretary of the council, he proposed sending a commission to Ireland to examine on-the-spot reprisals by the Black and Tans. 

In late 1920, he crossed the floor to sit as an independent MP on the opposition side of the House of Commons. Having built up a following in his constituency, he retained it against a Conservative challenge in the 1922 and 1923 general elections.

The Liberal Westminster Gazette wrote that Mosley was:

By 1924, he was growing increasingly attracted to the Labour Party, which had just formed a government, and in March he joined it. He immediately joined the Independent Labour Party (ILP) as well and allied himself with the left.

When the government fell in October, Mosley had to choose a new seat, as he believed that Harrow would not re-elect him as a Labour candidate. He therefore decided to oppose Neville Chamberlain in Birmingham Ladywood. Mosley campaigned aggressively in Ladywood, and accused Chamberlain of being a "landlords' hireling". The outraged Chamberlain demanded that Mosley retract the claim "as a gentleman". Mosley, whom Stanley Baldwin described as "a cad and a wrong 'un", refused to retract the allegation. Mosley was noted for bringing excitement and energy to the campaign. Leslie Hore-Belisha, then a Liberal Party politician who later became a senior Conservative, recorded his impressions of Mosley as a platform orator at this time, claiming that his "dark, aquiline, flashing: tall, thin, assured; defiance in his eye, contempt in his forward chin". Together, Oswald and Cynthia Mosley proved an alluring couple, and many members of the working class in Birmingham succumbed to their charm for, as the historian Martin Pugh described, "a link with powerful, wealthy and glamorous men and women appealed strongly to those who endured humdrum and deprived lives". It took several re-counts before Chamberlain was declared the winner by 77 votes and Mosley blamed poor weather for the result. His period outside Parliament was used to develop a new economic policy for the ILP, which eventually became known as the Birmingham Proposals; they continued to form the basis of Mosley's economics until the end of his political career.

Mosley was critical of Winston Churchill’s policy as Chancellor of the Exchequer. After Churchill returned Britain to the Gold Standard, Mosley claimed that "faced with the alternative of saying goodbye to the gold standard, and therefore to his own employment, and goodbye to other people's employment, Mr. Churchill characteristically selected the latter course".

In 1926, the Labour-held seat of Smethwick fell vacant, and Mosley returned to Parliament after winning the resulting by-election on 21 December. Mosley felt the campaign was dominated by Conservative attacks on him for being too rich, including claims that he was covering up his wealth.

In 1927, he mocked the British Fascists as "black-shirted buffoons, making a cheap imitation of ice-cream sellers". The ILP elected him to Labour's National Executive Committee.

Mosley and Cynthia were committed Fabians in the 1920s and at the start of the 1930s. Mosley appears in a list of names of Fabians from Fabian News and the Fabian Society Annual Report 1929–31. He was Kingsway Hall lecturer in 1924 and Livingstone Hall lecturer in 1931.

Office

Chancellor of the Duchy of Lancaster
Mosley then made a bold bid for political advancement within the Labour Party. He was close to Ramsay MacDonald and hoped for one of the Great Offices of State, but when Labour won the 1929 general election he was appointed only to the post of Chancellor of the Duchy of Lancaster, a position without Portfolio and outside the Cabinet. He was given responsibility for solving the unemployment problem, but found that his radical proposals were blocked either by Lord Privy Seal James Henry Thomas or by the Cabinet.

Mosley Memorandum
Realising the economic uncertainty that was facing the nation because of the death of its domestic industry, Mosley put forward a scheme in the "Mosley Memorandum" that called for high tariffs to protect British industries from international finance and transform the British Empire into an autarkic trading bloc, for state nationalisation of main industries, for higher school-leaving ages and pensions to reduce the labour surplus, and for a programme of public works to solve interwar poverty and unemployment. Furthermore, the memorandum laid out the foundations of the corporate state which intended to combine businesses, workers and the government into one body as a way to "Obliterate class conflict and make the British economy healthy again".

Mosley published this memorandum because of his dissatisfaction with the laissez-faire attitudes held by both Labour and the Conservative party, and their passivity towards the ever-increasing globalisation of the world, and thus looked to a modern solution to fix a modern problem. But it was rejected by the Cabinet and by the Parliamentary Labour Party, and in May 1930 Mosley resigned from his ministerial position. At the time, the weekly Liberal-leaning paper The Nation and Athenaeum described his move: "The resignation of Sir Oswald Mosley is an event of capital importance in domestic politics... We feel that Sir Oswald has acted rightly – as he has certainly acted courageously – in declining to share any longer in the responsibility for inertia." In October he attempted to persuade the Labour Party Conference to accept the Memorandum, but was defeated again.

The Mosley Memorandum won the support of the economist John Maynard Keynes, who stated that "it was a very able document and illuminating". Keynes also wrote, "I like the spirit which informs the document. A scheme of national economic planning to achieve a right, or at least a better, balance of our industries between the old and the new, between agriculture and manufacture, between home development and foreign investment; and wide executive powers to carry out the details of such a scheme. That is what it amounts to. ... [The] manifesto offers us a starting point for thought and action. ... It will shock—it must do so—the many good citizens of this country...who have laissez-faire in their craniums, their consciences, and their bones ... But how anyone professing and calling himself a socialist can keep away from the manifesto is a more obscure matter."

Thirty years later, in 1961, Richard Crossman wrote, "this brilliant memorandum was a whole generation ahead of Labour thinking." As his book, The Greater Britain, focused on the issues of free trade, the criticisms against globalisation that he formulated can be found in critiques of contemporary globalisation. He warns nations that buying cheaper goods from other nations may seem appealing but ultimately ravage domestic industry and lead to large unemployment, as seen in the 1930s. He argues that trying to "challenge the 50-year-old system of free trade ... exposes industry in the home market to the chaos of world conditions, such as price fluctuation, dumping, and the competition of sweated labour, which result in the lowering of wages and industrial decay."

In a newspaper feature, Mosley was described as "a strange blend of J.M. Keynes and Major Douglas of credit fame". From July 1930, he began to demand that government must be turned from a “talk-shop” into a “workshop.”

In 1992, the then UK prime minister, John Major, examined Mosley’s ideas in order to find an unorthodox solution to the aftermath of the 1990-91 economic recession.

New Party 

Dissatisfied with the Labour Party, Mosley founded the New Party.

Its early parliamentary contests, in the 1931 Ashton-under-Lyne by-election and subsequent by-elections, arguably had a spoiler effect in splitting the left-wing vote and allowing Conservative candidates to win. Despite this, the organisation gained support among many Labour and Conservative politicians who agreed with his corporatist economic policy, and among these were Aneurin Bevan and Harold Macmillan. Mosley's corporatism was complemented by Keynesianism, with Robert Skidelsky stating, "Keynesianism was his great contribution to fascism." It also gained the endorsement of the Daily Mail newspaper, headed at the time by Harold Harmsworth (later created 1st Viscount Rothermere).

The New Party increasingly inclined to fascist policies, but Mosley was denied the opportunity to get his party established when during the Great Depression the 1931 General Election was suddenly called – the party's candidates, including Mosley himself running in Stoke which had been held by his wife, lost the seats they held and won none. As the New Party gradually became more radical and authoritarian, many previous supporters defected from it. Shortly after the 1931 election, Mosley was described by The Manchester Guardian:

When Sir Oswald Mosley sat down after his Free Trade Hall speech in Manchester and the audience, stirred as an audience rarely is, rose and swept a storm of applause towards the platform – who could doubt that here was one of those root-and-branch men who have been thrown up from time to time in the religious, political and business story of England. First that gripping audience is arrested, then stirred and finally, as we have said, swept off its feet by a tornado of peroration yelled at the defiant high pitch of a tremendous voice.

Fascism 

After his election failure in 1931, Mosley went on a study tour of the "new movements" of Italy's Benito Mussolini and other fascists, and returned convinced, particularly by Fascist Italy's economic programme, that it was the way forward for Britain. He was determined to unite the existing fascist movements and created the British Union of Fascists (BUF) in 1932. The BUF was protectionist, strongly anti-communist and nationalistic to the point of advocating authoritarianism. He claimed that the UK Labour Party was pursuing policies of "international socialism", while fascism's aim was "national socialism". It claimed membership as high as 50,000, and had the Daily Mail and Daily Mirror among its earliest supporters. The Mirror piece was a guest article by the Daily Mail owner Viscount Rothermere and an apparent one-off; despite these briefly warm words for the BUF, the paper was so vitriolic in its condemnation of European fascism that Nazi Germany added the paper's directors to a hit list in the event of a successful Operation Sea Lion. The Mail continued to support the BUF until the Olympia rally in June 1934.

John Gunther described Mosley in 1940 as "strikingly handsome. He is probably the best orator in England. His personal magnetism is very great". Among Mosley's supporters at this time included John Strachey, the novelist Henry Williamson, military theorist J. F. C. Fuller, and the future "Lord Haw Haw", William Joyce.

Mosley had found problems with disruption of New Party meetings, and instituted a corps of black-uniformed paramilitary stewards, the Fascist Defence Force, nicknamed "Blackshirts", like the Italian fascist Voluntary Militia for National Security they were emulating. The party was frequently involved in violent confrontations and riots, particularly with communist and Jewish groups and especially in London. At a large Mosley rally at Olympia on 7 June 1934, his bodyguards' violence caused bad publicity. This and the Night of the Long Knives in Germany led to the loss of most of the BUF's mass support. Nevertheless, Mosley continued espousing anti-Semitism. At one of his New Party meetings in Leicester in April 1935, he said, "For the first time I openly and publicly challenge the Jewish interests of this country, commanding commerce, commanding the Press, commanding the cinema, dominating the City of London, killing industry with their sweat-shops. These great interests are not intimidating, and will not intimidate, the Fascist movement of the modern age." The party was unable to fight the 1935 general election.

In October 1936, Mosley and the BUF attempted to march through an area with a high proportion of Jewish residents. Violence, since called the Battle of Cable Street, resulted between protesters trying to block the march and police trying to force it through. At length Sir Philip Game, the Police Commissioner, disallowed the march from going ahead and the BUF abandoned it.

Mosley continued to organise marches policed by the Blackshirts, and the government was sufficiently concerned to pass the Public Order Act 1936, which, amongst other things, banned political uniforms and quasi-military style organisations and came into effect on 1 January 1937. In the London County Council elections in 1937, the BUF stood in three wards in East London (some former New Party seats), its strongest areas, polling up to a quarter of the vote. Mosley made most of the Blackshirt employees redundant, some of whom then defected from the party with William Joyce.

In October 1937 in Liverpool, he was knocked unconscious by two stones thrown by crowd members after he delivered a fascist salute to 8,000 people from the top of a van in Walton.

As the European situation moved towards war, the BUF began to nominate Parliamentary by-election candidates and launched campaigns on the theme of "Mind Britain's Business". Mosley remained popular as late as summer 1939. His Britain First rally at the Earls Court Exhibition Hall on 16 July 1939 was the biggest indoor political rally in British history, with a reported 30,000 attendees.

After the outbreak of war, Mosley led the campaign for a negotiated peace, but after the Fall of France and the commencement of aerial bombardment during the Battle of Britain overall public opinion of him became hostile. In mid-May 1940, he was nearly wounded by an assault.

Internment 
Unbeknown to Mosley, MI5 and the Special Branch had deeply penetrated the BUF and were also monitoring him through listening devices. Beginning in 1934, they were increasingly worried that Mosley's noted oratory skills would convince the public to provide financial support to the BUF, enabling it to challenge the political establishment. His agitation was officially tolerated until the events of the Battle of France in May 1940 made the government consider him too dangerous. Mosley, who at that time was focused on pleading for the British to accept Hitler's peace offer of March, was detained on 23 May 1940, less than a fortnight after Winston Churchill became Prime Minister. Mosley was interrogated for 16 hours by Lord Birkett but never formally charged with a crime, and was instead interned under Defence Regulation 18B. Most other active fascists in Britain met the same fate, resulting in the BUF's practical removal at an organised level from the United Kingdom's political stage. Mosley's wife, Diana, was also interned in June, shortly after the birth of their son (Max Mosley); the Mosleys lived together for most of the war in a house in the grounds of Holloway prison. The BUF was proscribed by the British Government later that year.

Mosley used the time in confinement to read extensively in classics, particularly regarding politics and war, with a focus upon key historical figures. He refused visits from most BUF members, but on 18 March 1943, Dudley and Norah Elam (who had been released by then) accompanied Unity Mitford to see her sister Diana. Mosley agreed to be present because he mistakenly believed that it was Lady Redesdale, Diana and Unity's mother, who was accompanying Unity. The internment, particularly that of Lady Mosley, resulted in significant public debate in the press, although most of the public supported the Government's actions. Others demanded a trial, either in the hope it would end the detention or in the hope of a conviction. During his internment he developed what would become a lifelong friendship with fellow prisoner Cahir Healy, a Catholic Irish nationalist MP for the Northern Irish parliament.

In November 1943, the Home Secretary, Herbert Morrison, ordered the release of the Mosleys. After a fierce debate in the House of Commons, Morrison's action was upheld by a vote of 327–26. Mosley, who was suffering with phlebitis, spent the rest of the war confined under house arrest and police supervision. On his release from prison, he first stayed with his sister-in-law Pamela Mitford, followed shortly by a stay at the Shaven Crown Hotel in Shipton-under-Wychwood. He then purchased Crux Easton House, near Newbury, with Diana. He and his wife remained the subject of much press attention.

Post-war politics
After the Second World War, Mosley was contacted by former supporters and persuaded to return to participation in politics. In 1948 he formed the Union Movement, which called for a single nation-state to cover the continent of Europe (known as Europe a Nation) and in 1962 attempted to launch a National Party of Europe to this end. He had connections with the Italian neo-Fascist political party,  Movimento Sociale Italiano, and contributed to a weekly Roman magazine,  (Ace of Clubs, published from 1948 to 1957), which was supported by his Europe a Nation. The New European has described Mosley as an "avowed Europhile". The Union Movement's meetings were often physically disrupted, as Mosley's meetings had been before the war, and largely by the same opponents. This may have contributed to his decision, in 1951, to leave Britain and live in Ireland. He responded to criticism of him abandoning his supporters in a hostile Britain for a life abroad by saying, "You don't clear up a dungheap from underneath it." In the 1950s Mosley advocated for Africa to be divided into black and white areas,
but the  decolonisation of the 1960s put an end to this proposal.

Mosley was a key pioneer in the emergence of Holocaust denial. While not denying the existence of Nazi concentration camps, he claimed that they were a necessity to hold "a considerable disaffected population", where problems were caused by lack of supplies due to "incessant bombing" by the Allies, with bodies burned in gas chambers due to typhus outbreaks, rather than being created by the Nazis to exterminate people. He sought to discredit pictures taken in places like  Buchenwald and  Belsen. He also claimed that the Holocaust was to be blamed on the Jews and that Adolf Hitler knew nothing about it. He criticised the Nuremberg trials as "a zoo and a peep show".

In the wake of the  1958 Notting Hill race-riots, Mosley briefly returned to Britain to stand in the 1959 general election at Kensington North. He led his campaign stridently on an anti-immigration platform, calling for forced repatriation of Caribbean immigrants as well as a  prohibition upon mixed marriages. Mosley's final share of the vote was 8.1%. Shortly after his failed election campaign, Mosley permanently moved to Orsay, outside Paris.

In 1961, he took part in a debate at University College London about  Commonwealth immigration, seconded by a young David Irving. He returned to politics one last time, contesting the 1966 general election at Shoreditch and Finsbury, and received 4.6% of the vote. After this, he retired and moved back to France, where he wrote his autobiography,  My Life (1968). In 1968 he remarked in a letter to The Times, "I am not, and never have been, a man of the right. My position was on the left and is now in the centre of politics."

In 1977, by which time he was suffering from Parkinson's disease, Mosley was nominated as a candidate for Rector of the University of Glasgow in which election he polled over 100 votes but finished bottom of the poll.

Mosley's political thought is believed to have influence on the organic farming movement in Great Britain. Henry Williamson, the agricultural writer and ruralist, put the theories of "blood and soil" into practice, which, in effect, acted as a demonstration farm for Mosley’s ideas for the BUF. In The Story of a Norfolk Farm (1941) Williamson recounts the physical and philosophical journey he undertook in turning the farm's worn-out soil back into fertile land. The tone contained in this text is more politically overt than in his nature works. Throughout the book, Williamson makes references to regular meetings he had held with his "Leader" (Mosley) and a group of like-minded agrarian thinkers. Lady Eve Balfour, a founder of the Soil Association, supported Mosley's proposals to abolish Church of England tithes on agricultural land (Mosley's blackshirts "protected" a number of East Anglian farms in the 1930s from the bailiffs authorised to extract payments to the Church). Jorian Jenks, another early member of the Soil Association, was active within the Blackshirts and served as Mosley's agricultural adviser.

Personal life 
Mosley had three children with his first wife Lady Cynthia Curzon.
 Vivien Elisabeth Mosley (1921–2002); she married Desmond Francis Forbes Adam (1926–58) on 15 January 1949. Adam had been educated at Eton College and at King's College, Cambridge. The couple had two daughters, Cynthia and Arabella, and a son, Rupert.
 Nicholas Mosley (1923–2017) (later 3rd Baron Ravensdale a title inherited from his mother's family), and 7th Baronet of Ancoats; he was a successful novelist who wrote a biography of his father and edited his memoirs for publication.
 Michael Mosley (1932–2012), unmarried and without issue.
In 1924, Lady Cynthia Curzon joined the Labour Party, and was elected as the Labour MP for Stoke-on-Trent in 1929. She later joined Oswald's New Party and lost the 1931 election in Stoke. She died in 1933 at 34 after an operation for peritonitis following acute appendicitis, in London.

Mosley had two children with his second wife, Diana Mitford (1910–2003):
 (Oswald) Alexander Mosley (1938–2005); father of Louis Mosley (born 1983)
 Max Mosley (1940–2021), who was president of the Fédération Internationale de l'Automobile (FIA) for 16 years

Death and funeral 
Oswald Mosley died on 3 December 1980 at Orsay. His body was cremated in a ceremony held at the Père Lachaise Cemetery, and his ashes were scattered on the pond at Orsay. His son Alexander stated that they had received many messages of condolence but no abusive words. "All that was a very long time ago," he said.

Archive and residences 
Mosley's personal papers are held at the University of Birmingham's Special Collections Archive.

Mosley's ancestral family residence, Rolleston Hall in Staffordshire, was demolished in 1928. Mosley and his first wife, Cynthia, also lived at Savay Farm, Denham. Immediately following his release in 1943, Mosley lived with his second wife, Diana, at Crux Easton, Hampshire In 1945, he moved to Crowood Farm, located near Marlborough, Wiltshire, which he ran. In November 1945, Mosley was summoned to court for allegedly causing unnecessary suffering to be caused to pigs by failing to provide adequate feeding and accommodation for them. When the decision of the court was announced, Mosley, who had pleaded not guilty, and summoned his own defence, was responsible for an outburst. The hearing lasted for five hours.

Mosley's residence in Fermoy, Co. Cork, Ireland, known as Ileclash House, was put up for sale in 2011, and again in 2016, 2018 and 2020. A Georgian style house, it was built in the 18th century and by 2011 was accompanied by 12 acres. It had fallen into a state of disrepair until it was purchased and restored by Mosley in the 1950s. In the same decade, he bought and restored Clonfert Palace, also in Ireland.

In popular culture

Alternative history fiction
Comics
 In the Elseworlds comic Superman: War of the Worlds, Mosley becomes prime minister after the defeat of the Martian invasion of 1938.

Literature 
 In Terrance Dicks' Doctor Who New Adventures novel Timewyrm: Exodus, Prime Minister Mosley is shown addressing Britain's first National Socialist parliament.
 In Kim Newman's The Bloody Red Baron, Mosley is shot down and killed in 1918 by Erich von Stalhein (from the Biggles series by W. E. Johns) and a character later comments that "a career has been ended before it was begun".
 In Philip Roth's The Plot Against America, a secret pact between Charles Lindbergh who has become president of the United States and Hitler includes an agreement to impose Mosley as the ruler of a German-occupied Britain with America's blessing after a ruse in which Lindbergh convinces Churchill to negotiate peace with Hitler, which deliberately fails – mirroring the dishonesty and repudiation of key Hitler-signed treaties, the Munich Conference Accord and Molotov–Ribbentrop Pact.
 In C. J. Sansom's novel Dominion, the Second World War ends in June 1940, when the British government, under the leadership of prime minister Lord Halifax, signs a peace treaty with Nazi Germany in Berlin. By November 1952, Mosley is the home secretary in the cabinet of Lord Beaverbrook, who leads a coalition government consisting of the pro-treaty factions of the Conservatives and Labour as well as the BUF. The government works closely and sympathises with the Nazi regime in Germany. Under Mosley's leadership, the police have become a feared force and an "Auxiliary Police" consisting mainly of British Union of Fascists thugs that has been set up to deal with political crime.
 In Lavie Tidhar's A Man Lies Dreaming (2014), Mosley is running for (and eventually becomes) prime minister, in a world where the Communist Party of Germany, rather than the Nazis, successfully overthrew the Weimar Republic in 1933.
 Mosley appears more than once in the works of Harry Turtledove.
 The Colonization trilogy sees Mosley, still an MP in 1963, spearheading an effort to pass legislation revoking the citizenship of all Jews; the plan fails in the short term.
 In the Presence of Mine Enemies (2003) empowers Mosley as British leader in a scenario in which Nazi Germany won the Second World War.
 In the Southern Victory series, Mosley is the minister of war under prime minister Winston Churchill in an authoritarian and revanchist Britain after the Entente lose the First Great War. Taking power around 1932, the Churchill/Mosley government joins the Kingdom of France and the Russian Empire in attacking the German Empire and the Central Powers in the Second Great War from 1941 to 1944 with disastrous results.
 In Guy Walters' The Leader, Mosley has taken power as "The Leader" of Great Britain in 1937. King Edward VIII is still on the throne after his marriage, Winston Churchill is a prisoner on the Isle of Man, and prime minister Mosley is conspiring with Adolf Hitler about the fate of Britain's Jewish population.
 In the sixth book in Jacqueline Winspear's Maisie Dobbs series, Among the Mad, Maisie's investigation takes her to a meeting of Oswald Mosley followers where violence ensues.
 In the 1944 Second World War novel Kaputt by Curzio Malaparte, Mosley appears in an important dream sequence. This happens in chapter IV of the book that is based on the writer's experiences in Moldavia, just before he recounts his first hand experiences of the Iași pogrom.
 In Roy Carter's alternative history novel, The Man Who Prevented WW2, Mosley wins the 1935 election, allies Britain with the Axis Powers, abolishes the monarchy and declares war on Ireland and France.

Film
In Darkest Hour (2017), Churchill, played by Gary Oldman, discusses with his Outer Cabinet the possibility of Britain becoming a slave state of Nazi Germany under Mosley if the decision is made to pursue peace talks right before his "We Shall Never Surrender" speech.
In the mockumentary It Happened Here (1964), showing a Nazi-occupied Britain in the mid-1940s, Mosley is never mentioned by name. A British fascist leader resembling him is, however, shown in "documentary" footage from the 1930s. Mosley's portrait can be seen alongside Hitler's in government offices. The film's fictional Immediate Action Organisation seems to be inspired by Mosley's British Union of Fascists, with members referred to as "blackshirts" and the symbol of the BUF appearing on their uniforms.

Historical and modern day fiction 
Film
 In the film Pink Floyd: The Wall (1982), during the "In the Flesh" segment, the character Pink (at this stage in the story, a modern Fascist leader) is dressed in a fashion similar to that of Mosley's.
 In the film The Remains of the Day (1993), the character Sir Geoffrey Wren is based loosely on Sir Oswald Mosley.

Literature
 Amanda K. Hale's novel Mad Hatter (2019) features Mosley as her father James Larratt Battersby's leader in the BUF.
 Aldous Huxley's novel Point Counter Point (1928) features Everard Webley, a character who is similar to Mosley in the 1920s, before Mosley left the Labour Party.
 In H. G. Wells's novel The Holy Terror (1939), the Mosley-like character Lord Horatio Bohun is the leader of an organisation called the Popular Socialist Party. The character is principally motivated by vanity, and is removed from leadership and sent packing to Argentina.
 P. G. Wodehouse's Jeeves short-story and novel series includes the character Sir Roderick Spode from 1938 to 1971, who is a parody of Mosley.

Music
 Originally, Elvis Costello's song "Less Than Zero" (1977) was an attack on Mosley and his politics. Listeners in the United States had assumed that the "Mr. Oswald" in the lyrics was Lee Harvey Oswald, so Costello wrote an alternative lyric to refer to Kennedy's assassin.
 On Mosley's release from prison in 1943, Ewan MacColl wrote the song "The Leader's a Bleeder", set to the tune of the Irish song "The Old Orange Flute". The song suggests that Mosley had been treated relatively well in prison owing to his aristocratic background.

Periodicals
 In 2006, BBC History magazine selected Mosley as the 20th century's worst Briton.

Television
 The Channel 4 biographical miniseries Mosley (1997) starred Jonathan Cake.
 The satirical television programme Not the Nine O'Clock News lampooned the British media's favourable 1980 obituaries of Mosley in a comedic music video, "Baronet Oswald Ernald Mosley". The actors, dressed as Nazi punks, performed a punk rock eulogy to Mosley, interweaving some of the positive remarks by newspapers from all sides of the political spectrum, including The Times and The Guardian.
The BBC Wales-produced 2010 revival of Upstairs Downstairs, set in 1936, included a storyline involving Mosley, the BUF and the Battle of Cable Street.
Mosley, played by Sam Claflin, was the primary antagonist in the fifth and sixth series of the BBC crime drama Peaky Blinders.
Mosley was played by Jonathan McGuinness in the first series of the BBC war drama World on Fire.

See also 
 The European
 Houston Stewart Chamberlain

References 
Notes

Citations

Bibliography

 
 
 
 
 

Further reading

 
 
 Gottlieb, Julie V. (2000). Feminine Fascism: Women in Britain's Fascist Movement 1923-1945. London: I.B. Tauris.

External links 

 Friends of Oswald Mosley at oswaldmosley.com, containing archives of his speeches and books
 
 
 
 
  (last accessible, 23 October 2017)
 
 
 
 

 
1896 births
1980 deaths
16th The Queen's Lancers officers
Anti-Masonry
Antisemitism in the United Kingdom
Baronets in the Baronetage of Great Britain
British Army personnel of World War I
British Holocaust deniers
British political party founders
British Union of Fascists politicians
British white supremacists
Chancellors of the Duchy of Lancaster
Conservative Party (UK) MPs for English constituencies
Deaths from Parkinson's disease
English expatriates in France
English far-right politicians
English memoirists
Graduates of the Royal Military College, Sandhurst
Independent Labour Party National Administrative Committee members
Independent members of the House of Commons of the United Kingdom
Labour Party (UK) MPs for English constituencies
Mosley baronets
Oswald
Neurological disease deaths in France
Pan-European nationalism
People detained under Defence Regulation 18B
People educated at West Downs School
People educated at Winchester College
People from Burton upon Trent
Racism in the United Kingdom
Royal Flying Corps officers
Sexism in the United Kingdom
UK MPs 1918–1922
UK MPs 1922–1923
UK MPs 1923–1924
UK MPs 1924–1929
UK MPs 1929–1931
Union Movement politicians
People_with_Parkinson's_disease